Athallia is a genus of fungi belonging to the family Teloschistaceae. It was first described in 2013 by Ulf Arup, Patrik Frödén, and Ulrik Søchting, and the type species is Athallia holocarpa. The genus name means without a thallus. 

All species of Athallia  lack a thallus or have a poorly developed thallus except for  A. scopularis, and all species show Chemosyndrome A.

Species:

Athallia alnetorum
Athallia baltistanica
Athallia brachyspora
Athallia cerinella
Athallia cerinelloides
Athallia holocarpa
Athallia inconnexa
Athallia nesodes
Athallia pyracea
Athallia saxifragarum
Athallia scopularis
Athallia skii
Athallia vitellinula

Gallery

References

Lichen genera
Teloschistales
Taxa described in 2013
Teloschistales genera